Biji Kola (also Romanized as Bījī Kolā; also known as Bejī Kolā and Bījā Kalā) is a village in Karipey Rural District, Lalehabad District, Babol County, Mazandaran Province, Iran. At the 2006 census, its population was 1,027, in 263 families.

References 

Populated places in Babol County